John Terry (born 1980) is an English retired footballer, currently the assistant manager at Aston Villa.

John Terry may also refer to:

John Terry (actor) (born 1950), American actor
John Terry (baseball) (1877–1958), Major League Baseball pitcher who played for the Detroit Tigers
John Terry (cartoonist) (1880–1934), creator of comic strip Scorchy Smith
John Terry (film financier) (1913–1995), founded the British Film School
John Terry (miller) (1771–1844), early settler and pioneer farmer in New Norfolk, Tasmania
John Terry (priest) (c. 1555–1625), Church of England clergyman
John Terry (weightlifter) (1908–1970), American Olympic weightlifter
John A. Terry (born 1933), American judge
John B. Terry (1796–1874), American businessman, soldier, and territorial legislator
John D. Terry (1845–1919), soldier and recipient of the Medal of Honor in the American Civil War
John H. Terry (judge) (1837–1916), American soldier, lawyer and legislator
John H. Terry (1924–2001), U.S. Representative from New York
John R. Terry (born 1977), British mathematician
John Terry (gridiron football) (born 1968), American football player
John W. Terry, plaintiff in Terry v. Ohio U.S. Supreme Court case
John Wesley Terry (1846–1???), Baptist preacher and labor leader
Tarcat Terry (John Terry), Negro leagues baseball player

See also
Jack Terry (born 1930), Polish-American holocaust survivor